Jangaon is a village in Nalgonda district in Telangana, India.

References

Villages in Nalgonda district